Ganzhousaurus (meaning "Ganzhou lizard") is an extinct genus of oviraptorid dinosaur known from the Late Cretaceous Nanxiong Formation of Nankang County, Ganzhou City of Jiangxi Province, southern China. It was found in a Maastrichtian deposit and contains a single species, Ganzhousaurus nankangensis. It is distinguished by a combination of primitive and derived features.

Phylogeny
Phylogenetic analysis places Ganzhousaurus within Oviraptoridae. Within Oviraptoridae its phylogenetic position is more unstable, with one phylogenetic analysis recovering it as a member of the Oviraptorinae and another recovering it as a more derived member of the group, closely related to "ingeniines" However, it also bears some similarities to the basal caenagnathid Gigantoraptor.

Paleobiology

Ganzhousaurus shared its habitat with at least four other oviraptorid species, Jiangxisaurus ganzhouensis, Nankangia jinzhouensis, Banji long, and an as-yet unnamed species. This diversity may have been made possible by niche partitioning, with Ganzhousaurus being primarily herbivorous.

See also

 Timeline of oviraptorosaur research

References

Late Cretaceous dinosaurs of Asia
Oviraptorids
Fossil taxa described in 2013
Paleontology in Jiangxi